Padmasree Bharat Dr. Saroj Kumar is a 2012 Indian Malayalam language spoof comedy film .The movie was directed by Sajin Raaghavan in his directorial debut. The movie starred Sreenivasan in titular role with Vineeth Sreenivasan, Fahadh Faasil, Jagathy Sreekumar, Suraj Venjaramoodu, Mukesh and Mamta Mohandas.The film is a spin-off of popular 2005 film Udayananu Tharam. Sreenivasan reprises the role of Megastar Saroj Kumar from the original. The director announced that this is not a sequel: Only some characters from Udayananu Tharam were used. The film was shot mainly in Chennai and Kochi.

Plot
Saroj Kumar is a megastar of the Malayalam film industry and one of the most popular actors in Kerala. He loses his fan base and hit films due to his arrogance and vanity; his latest films, like Vekkada Vedi turns into big a flop due to his bad heroism.

Alex Samuel and Pachalam Bhasi start their new film with Shyam meanwhile Saroj bribes film associations and gets Samuel and Bhasi's film banned. He gets the rank of Colonel in the Army and brags about it. Meanwhile Babykuttan, another producer, helps Alex Samuel and Pachalam Bhasi to resume their project. Saroj Kumar tries to cancel the film in many ways but it is successfully completed and is well received by the audience.

Meanwhile, the income tax department raids his premises and starts prosecution proceedings for tax evasion. Saroj is tense about the matter and he drinks a lot acting in a different manner. Many truths regarding Saroj's personal life get revealed towards the end. The film ends with a silhouette showing the film's timeline (and Saroj's failure) and Alex Samuel, along with Shyam, who is revealed to be Saroj Kumar's son and his first wife, celebrating the success of the film.

Cast

 Sreenivasan as Megastar Padmasree Bharat Dr. Saroj Kumar / Rajappan Thengumoodu
 Vineeth Sreenivasan as Shyam
 Fahadh Faasil as Alex Samuel 
 Mukesh as Babykkuttan
 Jagathy Sreekumar as Pachalam Bhasi
 Suraj Venjarammoodu as Muttathara Babu
 Salim Kumar as Rafeek
 Mamta Mohandas as Neelima
 Manikuttan as Rajesh
 Sandhya (special appearance)
 Meera Nandan (special appearance)
 Sarayu (special appearance)
 Roopa (special appearance)
 Nimisha Suresh (special appearance)
 Kollam Thulasi as Union Leader
 Liimal G Padath as Alex's Assistant  
 Apoorva Bose as Lekha, Shyam's Love interest
 Sajitha Betti as Neelima's friend
 Ponnamma Babu as Neelima's friend
 Shari as Shyam's mother
 Manoj Kumar as Shyam's neighbour
 Cherthala Lalitha as Shyam's neighbour
 Deepika Mohan as Servant

Production
About the idea of making Padmasree Bharat Dr. Saroj Kumar, Sreenivasan says:

The thought of the film came to us when we started thinking about what should be happening to a superstar like Saroj Kumar at this point of time. He is getting old and the most challenging aspect about stardom is that once you have got it, the next question is how long it will last. Some people can accept the changes in life in a mature way but for most others, it is never easy. This superstar is wary of new thoughts and new experiments because he knows he won't fit into the changing scheme of things. It is easy to be a hero in films as even a weak person can fight with any number of goons and get applause from viewers. But Dr Saroj Kumar forces the directors to cater to his thoughts. All this makes the character very exciting.

As the characters are already known to the viewers, the expectations could be huge. The film was mainly shot in Chennai and Kochi.

Reception

Critical reception
The film released on 14 January 2012 to mainly negative reviews from critics, although, the film's comedy scenes received praise. Paresh C. Palicha of Rediff.com concluded his review saying, "On the whole, Padmasree Bharat Dr. Saroj Kumar is disappointing, to say the least." Hari Prasad of Yentha.com said that "the film, despite having a good theme, suffers from a messy script." Sify.com and Oneindia.in also published negative reviews saying that it is "disappointing." Fahadh Faasil won the Asianet Youth Icon Award.

Controversies
Although Sreenivasan clarified that the characterisation of Saroj Kumar was not at all based on any existing superstars, it has been accused that Sreenivasan tried to mock actor Mohanlal. Many comments are made in the film about real happenings including Mohanlal's derogatory comments against Sukumar Azhikode, his Lieutenant Colonel honour, income tax raids and recovering of elephant tusks from his house, and his famous ad campaigns. S. Kumar, the cinematographer of the film, claimed live on television that he was threatened over phone by Antony Perumbavoor , a producer and close aide of Mohanlal.

Soundtrack

Music: Deepak Dev, Lyrics: Kaithapram Damodaran Namboothiri

See also
 Udayananu Tharam

References

External links
 
 Times of India report
 Metromatinee article

2010s Malayalam-language films
2012 comedy films
Indian comedy films
Indian satirical films
Films about films
2012 films
Indian sequel films
Rajappan2
Films shot in Kochi
Films shot in Chennai